Prometheus  is an inner satellite of Saturn. It was discovered in 1980 (on October 24) from photos taken by the Voyager 1 probe, and was provisionally designated .

In late 1985 it was officially named after Prometheus, a Titan in Greek mythology. It is also designated . 

It has several ridges and valleys and a number of impact craters of about  diameter are visible, but it is less cratered than nearby Pandora, Epimetheus, and Janus. From its very low density and relatively high albedo, it is likely that Prometheus is a very porous icy body. There is much uncertainty in these values, however, and so this remains to be confirmed.

Interactions with F Ring and other moons

Prometheus is a shepherd satellite for the inner edge of Saturn's narrow F Ring. Pandora orbits just outside the F Ring, and has traditionally been viewed as an outer shepherd of the ring; however, recent studies indicate that only Prometheus contributes to the confinement of the ring.

Images from the Cassini probe show that the Promethean gravitational field creates kinks and knots in the F Ring as it 'steals' material from it. The orbit of Prometheus appears to be chaotic, due to a series of four 121:118 mean-motion resonances with Pandora. The most appreciable changes in their orbits occur approximately every 6.2 years, when the periapsis of Pandora lines up with the apoapsis of Prometheus, as they approach to within approximately 1400 km. Prometheus is itself a significant perturber of Atlas, with which it is in a 53:54 mean-longitude resonance.

Selected images

Animations

References 

Citations

Sources

External links 

 
 Prometheus Profile at NASA's Solar System Exploration site
 The Planetary Society: Prometheus
 3-D anaglyph view of Prometheus

Moons of Saturn
Astronomical objects discovered in 1980
Articles containing video clips
Prometheus
Discoveries by Stewart A. Collins
Moons with a prograde orbit